Happy Valley may refer to several locations in New Zealand:

 Happy Valley, Wellington
 Happy Valley, West Coast, the site of an occupation by the Save Happy Valley Campaign